Diamond Cove may refer to:

 Diamond Cove, Calgary, a small residential neighbourhood
 Diamond Cove, Newfoundland and Labrador, a small settlement
 Diamond Cove, a ferry stop on Great Diamond Island, Maine